Alfa Romeo A15 / A19 / A38 / F20 are a discontinued line of utility trucks, or lorries, produced by Alfa Romeo from 1967-1974.

The models originated from the collaboration between Alfa Romeo and Saviem (part of the Renault group), which was signed in 1967. The collaboration began earlier when Renault and Alfa Romeo produced R4 and Dauphines in Italy.

The Lorries that were produced following this agreement were similar to Saviem SG2 (A15/A19) and SG4 (A38) models. Around 3,500 units of A15, A38, A19 and F20 were produced in the Pomigliano d'Arco plant near Naples before 1974. The Alfa Romeo naming of lorries and vans reflected the production options chosen by the customer. This comprised a letter followed by two digits: A for "Autocarro" (truck) or F for "Furgone" (van), plus a number referring to the payload (expressed in quintals, as is the usual practice in Italy).

Saviem did not want this engine and insisted on mounting their own diesel engine, which developed only , a level of power that was deemed insufficient in comparison to competing Italian vehicles. This engine was subsequently installed in French models from 1967.

A15

A19
Four years after launch, the displacement was updated 3,319 cc.

A38
The A38, with its 6.3 tons full load, was available with several chassis (including a shielded autotelaio and a bus chassis), which were characterized by having different steps. It was also available in an all-wheel drive variant. The A38 was available in several variants: a basic A38, an A38/L1  wheelbase, and an A38/L2  wheelbase.

In 1970 the round headlights were replaced by oval headlights. At the same time, the Alfa Romeo A38 became A38n, an advanced model.

The four-wheel drive version was developed in collaboration with the company Man Meccanica on the basis of an Alfa Romeo A19, an adaptation almost identical to that carried out in France by Sinpar TP3 (also Saviem TP3).

F20
The Alfa Romeo F20 was presented at the Turin 1967 as a prototype and produced from 1969. It was born out of a collaboration agreement between Alfa Romeo and Saviem and signed in 1967.

The F20 was offered as a paneled van with sliding side door, another with side doors on each side, and a final version without any side door. A chassis-bare version was also offered to coachbuilders for further customization.

Production end
Alfa Romeo-Saviem production ended in 1974, and the Alfa Romeo vans AR40 and AR80 were not produced until 1978, when they were rebadged Iveco Daily. This was the second commercial failure. The vehicles sold poorly because they had underpowered engines for Italy's topography, and had payloads which were too low. High royalty prices far above customs duties were also a factor. Alfa Romeo abandoned this cooperation and joined forces with Fiat Veicoli Industriali in the industrial vehicle sector. Renault-Saviem reacted reasonably, and the French group sought technical cooperation with Fiat and Alfa Romeo, with whom they signed an agreement on September 13, 1974 for the creation of a joint venture (Sofim - Société Franco Italienne de Moteurs). The aim of this venture was to design and manufacture fast and powerful new-cylinder engines. The new factory was constructed in the municipality of Foggia in the south of Italy. Each manufacturer contributed 33.33% of the capital. The first engines—released in 1977—gave the factory an excellent reputation. They were named the Sofim 8140, with a displacement of  developing  and were used in many vehicles, cars and utilities of the three brands.

References

Alfa Romeo trucks
Vehicles introduced in 1967
fr:Alfa Romeo A15-A19-A38-F20